This is a list of songs about Toronto, Ontario, Canada, set there, named after a location, feature of the city, or mentions of the city.

0-9
 "416/905 (T.O. Party Anthem)" by Maestro Fresh Wes
 "10 Bands" by Drake
 "6 Man" by Drake
 "6 God" by Drake
"5am in Toronto" by Drake
502 Come Up by Bryson Tiller

A
"Alberta Bound" by Gordon Lightfoot
"All Me" by Drake ft 2 Chainz and Big Sean
"Ambulance Blues" by Neil Young
"AquaCityBoy" by k-os
"At the Roncies" (Toronto's Roncesvalles Avenue) by Jully Black
"Augusta" by Kurt Swinghammer

B

"Back to Back" by Drake
"Backyard" by The Good Lovelies
"BaKardi Slang" by Kardinal Offishall
"Ballade à Toronto" by Jean Leloup
"Bartlett Street" by Kurt Swinghammer
"Bathurst Flat" by Kurt Swinghammer
"betterman" by Virginia To Vegas
"Beverley Street" by Blue Rodeo
"Black Ice" by Ohbijou
"Bleed a Little While Tonight" by The Lowest of the Low
"Bless This City" by Sunparlour Players
"Blue Jay Season" by Tory Lanez
"Bobcaygeon" by the Tragically Hip
"Body" by Loud Luxury
"Break From Toronto" by PartyNextDoor
"Browns Line" by The Johnny Max Band
"Buried Alive Interlude" by Drake ft. Kendrick Lamar

C
"Call My Name" by Prince
"Cherry Beach" by Career Suicide
"Cherry Beach Express" by Pukka Orchestra
"Church Bells Ringing (Christmas in the City) by Skydiggers
"Christmastime in Toronto" by Gord Downie
"Civic Kiss" by Kurt Swinghammer
"Closing Time" by Leonard Cohen
"Cold,Cold Toronto" by Trooper
"Coldest Night of the Year" by Bruce Cockburn
"Cold Steel Hammer" by Big Rude Jake
"CN Tower" by Michaele Jordana and the Poles
"Concrete Heart" by Great Lake Swimmers
"Crabbuckit" by k-os
"Can't Believe it" by T-Pain feat. Lil Wayne
"City Is Mine" by Drake
"Christmastime In Toronto" by Gordon Downie

D
"Dope Fiends and Boozehounds" by the Rheostatics
"Down by the Henry Moore" by Murray McLauchlan
"Do The Slither" by Pukka Orchestra
 "Don’t Run" by PARTYNEXTDOOR
"DVP" by PUP

F
"Fancy" by Drake, from Thank Me Later 2010
"Flypaper" by k-os
"Fam Jam" by Shad
"Forests and Sand" by Camera Obscura

G
"Get Dark" by The Zolas
"Get Ready" by Shawn Desman
"Greaklakescape" by The Ghost Is Dancing

H

"Haig Earl" by Shadowy Men on a Shadowy Planet
"Hang on to Your Resistance" by Tom Cochrane
"Hard Deep Junction Blues" by Big Rude Jake
"Henry Rollins Is No Fun" by Chixdiggit
"Home" by MONOWHALES
"Home" by Rusty
"Home Sweet Home" by Ron Hawkins and the Do Good Assassins
"Honky Tonk (Toronto)" by Rae Spoon
"Horseshoe Bay" by Skydiggers
"Hello Brooklyn" by All Time Low

I
"I Don't Want to Go to Toronto" by Radio Free Vestibule
"I've Been Everywhere" by Hank Snow
"Illustrating Man" by Kurt Swinghammer
"I Will Never See the Sun" by Great Lake Swimmers
"If I Can’t Have You" by Shawn Mendes
"In The Tdot" by Aspektz
"Intentions" by Justin Bieber
"IVIVI" by Lilly Singh (AKA IISuperwomanII) and Humble The Poet

J
"Jack Layton And Grace Appleton" by Kurt Swinghammer
"Just About "The Only" Blues" by The Lowest of the Low
"Jane" by Barenaked Ladies
"Jane Station" by The Ghost Is Dancing
"Jimmy Fall Down" by Blue Rodeo

K
"King Edward Hotel" by Matt Paxton
"Know Yourself" by Drake
"King of the Fall" by The Weeknd

L
"La Villa Strangiato (An Exercise in Self-Indulgence) VII. Danforth and Pape" by Rush
"Let's Ride" by Choclair
"Lightfoot" by The Guess Who
"Lilly Of The 401" by Kurt Swinghammer
"Live from the Gutter" by Drake and Future

M
"Magpie" by Big Rude Jake
"Might Not" by Belly and The Weeknd
"Mr. Metro" by Devon
"My Baby Loves a Bunch of Authors" by Moxy Früvous
"Municipal Prick" by Fucked Up

N
"Neck Deep in the Blues" by Big Rude Jake
"Neon City" by Rita MacNeil
"Northern Touch" by Rascalz ft. Kardinal Offishall, Thrust, Checkmate, Choclair

O
"Olympic Island" by The Diableros
"On Yonge Street" by Gordon Lightfoot
"Out Of Thin Air" by Kurt Swinghammer

P
"Paris Be Mine" by The Bicycles
"Parkdale" by Elizabeth Sheppard
"Parkdale" by Metric
"Peace and Quiet" by Ron Hawkins
"People City" by Gary Gray and Tommy Ambrose
"Pink Floyd Dude" by Kurt Swinghammer

Q
"Quarantine" by Career Suicide
"Queen Jane" by Barzin

S
"Salesmen, Cheats and Liars" by The Lowest of the Low
"Scarborough Girl" by Kobo Town ft. Calypso Rose
"Skyline" by Broken Social Scene
"Sleeping In Toronto" by Jim Bryson
"SnowTime" by James Taylor
"Something to Believe In" by The Lowest of the Low
"Spadina Bus" by The Shuffle Demons
"Spadina Expressway" by Dan Bryk
"Started from the Bottom" by Drake
"Summer Sixteen" by Drake
"Sweeterman" by Zach Farache

T
"Tell Your Friends" by The Weeknd
"That Song About Trees & Kites" by The Lowest of the Low
"The Anthem" by Kardinal Offishall
"The CN Tower Belongs to the Dead" by Final Fantasy
"The Embassy (223 Augusta)" by Henri Fabergé and the Adorables
"The King of Spain" by Moxy Früvous
"The Light That Guides You Home" by Jim Cuddy
"The Old Apartment" by Barenaked Ladies
"The Signature Of Marilyn Churley" by Kurt Swinghammer
"The Toronto Song" ("Toronto Sucks") by Three Dead Trolls in a Baggie
"The Troubadour's Song" by Stephen Stanley
"This Beat Goes On/Switchin' to Glide" by The Kings
"This Lamb Sells Condos" by Final Fantasy
"To It and At It" by Stompin' Tom Connors
"Tony Montana" by Future Feat. Drake
"Toronto" by Lenny Breau
"Toronto (Unabridged)" by Silverstein
"Toronto Sucks" by Three Dead Trolls in a Baggie
"Totally Untitled" by Kupek
"Trinity Bellwoods" by Treble Charger
"Toronto" by Tusks
"Toronto #4" by The Tragically Hip
"T.O. Gold" by Honey Cocaine

U
"Uber Everywhere" by MadeinTYO
"Under the Carlaw Bridge" by The Lowest of the Low
"Under the Mynah Bird" by Stephen Stanley

W
"Wayward and Parliament" by Amy Millan
"Weston Road Flows" by Drake
"Western Skies" by Blue Rodeo
"What Have You Got To Do (To Get Off Tonight)" by Red Rider
"Where U Goin" by Arkells
"Where Ya At" by Drake and Future

Y
"You & the 6" by Drake
"YYZ" by Rush

Songs with videos of Toronto

These songs, while not having Toronto in their names, lyrics, or in content, have, as their (promotional) videos, scenes of Toronto.

Free by The Tea Party
I'm an Adult Now by The Pursuit of Happiness
Pour ton sourire by Jorane featuring Daniel Lanois
Pretty by The Weeknd on Kiss Land album
Rise Up by Parachute Club
Romantic Traffic by the Spoons
Simple Man by Wale
Little Bones by The Tragically Hip
Mans Not Hot by Big Shaq
Toes by Lights
 50 Cent || "God Gave Me Style" 
Addictiv || "Over It (Cry Baby)" 
Anvil || "Mad Dog"
Austra || "Beat And The Pulse" 
Barenaked Ladies || "Enid" 
Barenaked Ladies || "Lovers In A Dangerous Time" 
Barenaked Ladies || "The Old Apartment" 
Big Wreck || "That Song" 
The Boomtang Boys and Kim Esty || "Pictures" 
Boys Brigade || "Melody" 
Boys Brigade || "The Passion Of Love" 
Paul Brandt || "That's The Truth" 
Cancer Bats || "French Immersion" 
Brendan Canning || "Love Is New" 
Alessia Cara || "Scars to Your Beautiful" || 2016 
Chalk Circle || "April Fool" 
Kelly Clarkson || "Behind These Hazel Eyes" 
Kelly Clarkson || "Already Gone"
Clipse || "Ma, I Don't Love Her" 
Cowboy Junkies || "Sun Comes Up Its Tuesday Morning" 
The Cranberries || "Animal Instinct" 
Anna Cyzon || "Young Boy" 
Howie Day || "Collide" 
Deadmau5 || "Ghosts 'n' Stuff" |
Default || "Wasting My Time" 
Delerium feat Leigh Nash || "Innocente (Falling In Love)"
Celine Dion || "You And I" 
Melanie Doane || "Happy Homemaker"
Damhnait Doyle || "Tattooed" 
Drake || "Headlines" from Take Care (album)
Hilary Duff || "Our Lips Are Sealed"
Hilary Duff || "Play With Fire" 
Hilary Duff || "Wake Up" 
Duran Duran || "The Reflex" 
Econoline Crush || "You Don't Know What It's Like" 
The Ennis Sisters || "It's Not About You"
Esthero || "That Girl" 
Feist || "1234" 
Finger Eleven || "Drag You Down" 
Glass Tiger || "Someday" 
Corey Hart || "Never Surrender" 
Haywire || "Bad Boy"
Haywire || "Dance Desire" 
Honeymoon Suite || "New Girl Now" 
The Johnstones || "Gone For A Long Time" 
Donnell Jones || "Where I Wanna Be" 
k-os || "Crabbuckit"
Kardinal Offishall || "Bakardi Slang" 
Chantal Kreviazuk || "Dear Life" 
Lady Antebellum || "Need You Now" 
Len || "It's My Neighbourhood" 
LIGHTS || "Toes" 
Lisa Lougheed || "Run With Us" 
Love Inc. || "Broken Bones" 
Maestro Fresh Wes || "Let Your Backbone Slide" 
Marilyn Manson || "The Beautiful People"
Martha And The Muffins || "Danseparc (Every Day It's Tomorrow)" 
Martha And The Muffins || "Echo Beach" 
Edward Maya and Mia Martina || "Stereo Love" 
Melanie C || "Understand" 
Kim Mitchell || "All We All"
The Moffatts || "Misery" 
Mudvayne || "Forget to Remember" 
Anne Murray || "Now And Forever" 
Mýa || "Fallen" 
Organized Rhyme || "Check the O.R." 
P Reign || "We Them Niggaz" 
Paint || "Boomerang" 
Parachute Club || "Rise Up" 
Peaches || "Set It Off" 
Platinum Blonde || "Not In Love"
Play || "Us Against The World" 
Pukka Orchestra || "Listen To The Radio" 
The Pursuit Of Happiness || "I'm An Adult Now"
Rush || "Subdivisions
Sasha || "If You Believe" 
The Shuffle Demons || "Spadina Bus" 
Simple Plan || "Jet Lag" 
Roni Size || "Brown Paper Bag" 
Shawn Mendes || "Life Of The Party" 
Snow || "Everybody Wants To Be Like You" 
Snow || "Informer" 
Snow || "Plum Song" 
The Spoons || "Romantic Traffic" 
The Spoons || "You Light Up" 
Tate McRae || "You Broke Me First"
Tears For Fears || "Head Over Heels" 
Thirty Seconds to Mars || "The Kill" 
Trans-X || "Message On The Radio" 
The Trews || "Hope & Ruin" 
The Used || "Take It Away" 
The Used || "The Bird And The Worm" 
The Weeknd || "Secrets" on Starboy (album) 
The Weeknd || "Wicked Games"

References

Toronto
Culture of Toronto
Toronto-related lists
Toronto
Works about Toronto